Leene is a Dutch surname. Notable people with the surname include:

 Bernard Leene (1903–1988), Dutch track cyclist and resistance fighter
 Jentina E. Leene (1906–1994), Dutch scientist

Dutch-language surnames